Dasychiroides is a genus of moths in the subfamily Lymantriinae. The genus was erected by George Thomas Bethune-Baker in 1904.

Species
Dasychiroides obsoleta Bethune-Baker, 1904 New Guinea
Dasychiroides bicolora Bethune-Baker, 1904 New Guinea
Dasychiroides pratti Bethune-Baker, 1904 New Guinea
Dasychiroides brunneostrigata Bethune-Baker, 1904 New Guinea
Dasychiroides nesites Collenette, 1932 New Britain

References

Lymantriinae